Rhys Clarstedt (born 27 October 1997), better known as simply Rhys, is a Swedish-American singer and songwriter. Her singles "Swallow Your Pride" and "Last Dance" became hits in Sweden. In 2018 she released her debut album Stages.

Early life
Rhys moved to Stockholm, Sweden from Portland, Oregon at the age of ten with her parents and sister. During this time she showed interest in arts, theater, dance and music, and she participated in several talent shows. She studied music at Kulturama, and theater at Viktor Rydberg Gymnasium.

Career
At the age of eighteen she got to meet music producer Jörgen Elofsson to record a demo. Elofsson really liked her voice, and he started to work with her and help her with her music.

Her first music single "Swallow Your Pride" was released on 25 November 2016 and was written by Rhys herself and Elofsson. The song was named Song of the Week by Sveriges Radio. Rhys performed in Musikhjälpen on 14 December 2016.

On 17 February 2017, she released her next music single called "Last Dance" written by Elofsson. During the summer of 2017 Rhys has performed at Swedish television shows like Sommarkrysset and Lotta på Liseberg. During the same summer she performed in several music festivals such as  Way Out West, Storsjöyran and We Are Sthlm.

On 30 August 2017, the US fashion magazine Vogue published an article about Rhys while she appeared at Stockholm Fashion Week.

Discography

Singles

Notes

References

1997 births
Living people
21st-century Swedish women singers
21st-century American women singers
American electronic musicians
American emigrants to Sweden
American women pop singers
American women singer-songwriters
American women in electronic music
Musicians from Portland, Oregon
Musicians from Stockholm
Swedish electronic musicians
Swedish people of American descent
Swedish pop singers
Swedish singer-songwriters
Swedish songwriters
Swedish women in electronic music
English-language singers from Sweden
Warner Music Group artists
21st-century American singers
American singer-songwriters